On 27 February 2013, a gunman opened fire at the Kronospan wood-processing plant in the Swiss town of Menznau, killing four people. Five others were wounded, two critically. The gunman died during a struggle where another worker defended himself by throwing a chair at the gunman, then grabbed with both arms the gunman, during the struggle the gunman shot himself, although it was not possible to determine whether intentionally or accidentally.

Shooting
The shooting, which took place at approximately 09:00 CET (08:00 UTC), occurred in the canteen area of the plant. The wounded were flown to two area hospitals for treatment.
Among the victims was Benno Studer (born 29 December 1986), a successful Swiss Wrestler active in competitions since 2007, with notable victories in 2010 and 2011.

The gunman was identified as Viktor Berisha (in Swiss media mostly anonymized as "Viktor B."), aged 42, a Kosovar Albanian who had received asylum in Switzerland in 1991, and who had been convicted to a prison sentence for robbery in 1998. At some point after 2003, he was naturalized as a Swiss citizen. The weapon used by the perpetrator was a Sphinx Systems model AT380 sub-compact pistol, legally owned by Berisha's brother. Berisha was married and had three children.

Victims
Thomas M., 44, died on February 28
Christina N., 47
Hans S., 61, died on April 4
Benno Studer, 26

References

2013 mass shootings in Europe
Mass murder in 2013
2013 in Switzerland
Canton of Lucerne
February 2013 events in Europe
Mass shootings in Switzerland
2013 murders in Switzerland